Abidnasir Shabab (born 27 September 1965) is a Jordanian boxer. He competed in the men's light welterweight event at the 1988 Summer Olympics. At the 1988 Summer Olympics, he lost to David Kamau of Kenya.

References

External links
 

1965 births
Living people
Jordanian male boxers
Olympic boxers of Jordan
Boxers at the 1988 Summer Olympics
Place of birth missing (living people)
Light-welterweight boxers